James Omondi Adede (born 31 October 1986) is a Kenyan Olympic weightlifter. He represented his country at the 2016 Summer Olympics. He is coached by David Adeyemo of Nigeria, and John Ogolla.

References 

1986 births
Living people
Kenyan male weightlifters
Weightlifters at the 2016 Summer Olympics
Olympic weightlifters of Kenya